Peridea is a genus of moths of the family Notodontidae described by Stephens in 1828.

Species
Peridea anceps (Goeze, 1781)
Peridea korbi (Rebel, 1918)
Peridea monetaria (Oberthür, 1879)
Peridea lativitta (Wileman, 1911)
Peridea dichroma Kiriakoff, 1959
Peridea elzet Kiriakoff, 1963
Peridea hoenei Kiriakoff, 1963
Peridea graeseri (Staudinger, 1892)
Peridea aliena (Staudinger, 1892)
Peridea moltrechti (Oberthür, 1911)
Peridea grahami (Schaus, 1928)
Peridea gigantea Butler, 1877
Peridea oberthueri (Staudinger, 1892)
Peridea sikkima (Moore, 1879)
Peridea albipuncta (Gaede, 1930)
Peridea basitriens (Walker, 1855)
Peridea angulosa (Smith, 1797)
Peridea ferruginea (Packard, 1864)

References

Notodontidae